Canbya, also known as the pygmy poppies, is a genus of the poppy family Papaveraceae consisting of two species found in the dry parts of western North America. Both species are small, no more than a few centimeters tall, with flowers less than 10 mm across.

The genus was named after well-known amateur botanist William Marriott Canby (1831–1904).

Species

References

 Christopher Grey-Wilson, Poppies (Portland: Timber Press, 2000)  p. 229

External links

Papaveroideae
Papaveraceae genera
Flora of the California desert regions